Jasad is a death metal band from Bandung, Indonesia, formed in 1990.

Career

Formation, debut and second album (1990-2005)
The band was formed by bassist Yuli in 1990; the Indonesian word "Jasad" means "dead bodies". Yuli is the original member left today.

In their early years, the band had already have their own materials, but mostly were lost for whatever reasons. Their first EP C'est La Vie was released in 1996 through Palapa Records, a local independent label from Bandung.

In 1999 vocalist Man and guitarist Ferly joined the band. The other two personnels were drummer Dani Papap and original bassist Yuli. This would be their first solid line-up until 2011 when Dani quits. Their debut full-length album Witness of Perfect Torture was released in 2001 through Rottrevore Records, followed by two demos Ripping The Pregnant in 2001 and Demo 2005 in 2005.

The second album Annihilate The Enemy was released in 2005 through Sevared Records.

Filmography

Split DVD, drummer change and third album (2005-present)
A split DVD named Rottrevore Death Fest was released in 2006. It's a split compilation DVD containing four Indonesian metal bands including Jasad. The three other bands are Siksakubur, Forgotten and Disinfected.

On 2011 Dani Papap quit the band, ending the 12 years of solid line-up since 1999. Dani was replaced by Abaz and they released the third album Rebirth of Jatisunda in 2013 through Extreme Souls Production. Unlike their first two albums which contains several English lyrics, Rebirth of Jatisunda is a blend of Indonesian, Sundanese and English lyrics.

Band members

Current members
 Yuli Darma - bass (1990–present)
 Mohamad Rohman - vocals (1999–present)
 Ferly - guitar (1999–present)
 Reduan Purba - guitar (2015–present)
 Oki Fadhlan - drums (2017-present)

Former members
 Faried - guitar (1990-1992)
 Tito Kelly - guitar (1990-1996)
 Hendrik - guitar (1992-1996)
 Abut - drums (1992-1994)
 Yayat Achdiat - guitar (1994-1999)
 Yadi Priadi - vocals (1994-1998)
 Dani Ramadhani - drums (1994-2011)
 Ricky Wisisena - guitar (1996)
 Sebastian Abas - drums (2011-2016)

Interview
Jasad interview on Metalmarch.com

Discography

Studio albums
 Witness of Perfect Torture (2001)
 Annihilate the Enemy (2005)
 Rebirth of Jatisunda (2013)
 5 (2019)

Extended plays
 C'est La Vie (1996)

Demos
 Ripping the Pregnant (2001)
 Demo 2005 (2005)
 Promo Demo (2011)

DVD
 Rottrevore Death Fest (split DVD, 2006)

References

Indonesian heavy metal musical groups
Sevared Records artists